This table displays the top-rated primetime television series of the 2001–02 season as measured by Nielsen Media Research.

References

2001 in American television
2002 in American television
2001-related lists
2002-related lists
Lists of American television series